Kevin Gillis (born 2 February 1950) is a Canadian TV TV writer and producer, a singer-songwriter and a former TV host, mainly known for his work in animation. He is famous for creating the Raccoons franchise as well as other cartoons such as Atomic Betty and Producing Parker. He was the host of the fitness show Yes You Can and was originally the managing director at Breakthrough Animation. Gillis is the co-founder and CEO of Skywriter Media & Entertainment Group which develops, produces and distributes television and other forms of media. He was also president of Skyreader Media Inc., an affiliated company of Skywriter Media & Entertainment Group, which produces, develops and distributes interactive e-books.

Works

Director
 The Christmas Raccoons (1980)
 The Raccoons on Ice (1981)
 The Raccoons and the Lost Star (1983)
 The Raccoons: Let's Dance! (1984)
 The Raccoons (1985–1991)

Writer
 The Christmas Raccoons (1980)
 The Raccoons on Ice (1981)
 The Raccoons and the Lost Star (1983)
 The Raccoons: Let's Dance! (1984)
 The Raccoons (1985–1991)
 The Nutcracker Prince (1990)
 Jimmy Two-Shoes (2009)

Composer
 The Christmas Raccoons (1980)
 The Raccoons on Ice (1981)
 The Raccoons and the Lost Star (1983)
 The Raccoons: Let's Dance! (1984)
 The Raccoons (1985–1991)
 Heart of Courage (1993)
 RoboCop: The Series (1994)
 Atomic Betty (2004–2008)

Producer
 The Christmas Raccoons (1980)
 The Raccoons on Ice (1981)
 The Raccoons and the Lost Star (1983)
 The Raccoons: Let's Dance! (1984)
 The Raccoons (1985–1991)
 The Jeff Healey Band: See the Light – Live from London (1989)
 The Nutcracker Prince (1990)
 Secret Service (1992)
 Heart of Courage (1993)
 A Future to This Life: Robocop - The Series Soundtrack (1995)
 F/X: The Series (1996–1998)
 The True Meaning of Crumbfest (1998)
 Universal Soldier II: Brothers in Arms (1998)
 Universal Soldier III: Unfinished Business (1998)
 Eckhart (2000)
 I Was a Rat (2001)
 Kids World Sports (2004)
 Miss BG (2005–2008)
 Captain Flamingo (2006)
 Atomic Betty (2004–2008)
 Producing Parker (2009–2011)
 Jimmy Two-Shoes (2009–2011)
 My Big Big Friend (2009, post-production)

Actor
 Yes You Can (1980–1983)
 The Raccoons: Let's Dance! (1984) – Ranger Dan (uncredited)
 Noonbory and the Super Seven (2009) – Wangury (as Kevin Aichele)

References

External links
 

1950 births
Canadian television directors
Canadian television writers
Canadian television composers
Canadian television producers
Canadian television hosts
Living people